Conus marchionatus, common name the Marquesas cone, is a species of sea snail, a marine gastropod mollusk in the family Conidae, the cone snails and their allies.

Like all species within the genus Conus, these snails are predatory and venomous. They are capable of "stinging" humans, therefore live ones should be handled carefully or not at all.

Description
The size of the shell varies between 12 mm and 68 mm. The spire is depressed and shows spiral striae. Its color is yellowish or light brown, with large white rounded triangular spots. The pattern of coloring is very like Conus marmoreus, but lighter. The shell is immediately distinguished by the want of the coronal of tubercles and its usually small size.

Distribution
This species occurs in the Pacific Ocean off the Marquesas.

References

 Adams, A. 1855a. "Descriptions of new species of the genus Conus, from the collection of Hugh Cuming, Esq." Proceedings of the Zoological Society of London. 1854: 116–119.
 Puillandre N., Duda T.F., Meyer C., Olivera B.M. & Bouchet P. (2015). "One, four or 100 genera? A new classification of the cone snails". Journal of Molluscan Studies. 81: 1–23

External links
 The Conus Biodiversity website
 Cone Shells - Knights of the Sea
 

marchionatus
Gastropods described in 1843